Děčín main station (Cz: Děčín hlavní nádraží)  is a railway station in the city of Děčín, in the Ústí nad Labem Region of the Czech Republic. The station opened in 1850 and is located on the Děčín–Benešov nad Ploučnicí–Rumburk railway, Praha–Ústí nad Labem–Děčín railway, Děčín–Dresden-Neustadt railway and Děčín–Oldřichov u Duchcova railway. The train services are operated by Czech Railways (České dráhy ČD).

References

 This article is based upon a translation of the Czech language version as of May 2016.

External links
 

hlavní nádraží
Railway stations in Ústí nad Labem Region
Railway stations opened in 1850

Railway stations in the Czech Republic opened in 1850